Moster may refer to:

People
Edmund Moster (1873–1942), a Croatian Jewish entrepreneur, industrialist, inventor and co-founder of the "Penkala-Moster Company"
Kjetil Møster (born 1976), a Norwegian jazz musician and composer
Naftuli Moster (born 1986), social activist and founder of YAFFED, Young Advocates for Fair Education
Tommy Eide Møster (born 1983), a Norwegian footballer for the team Bryne FK

Places
Moster, a former municipality (1916–1963) in Hordaland county, Norway
Moster (island), an island off the coast of the larger island of Bømlo, Norway
Moster, also known as Mosterhamn, a village in Bømlo municipality in Vestland county, Norway
Moster Church, a church in Bømlo municipality in Vestland county, Norway
Old Moster Church, a historic church in Bømlo municipality in Vestland county, Norway

Other
Gelber Moster, a variety of white wine grape
Moster or Chasselas, a variety of white wine grape
Moster (motion movie poster), a high resolution animation of an original film poster authorized by the movie's film studio